Sara Oliver (born July 8, 1996) is a Canadian curler from Winnipeg. She is a former World Mixed Curling Champion.

Career

Juniors
Oliver skipped teams at both the 2014 and 2015 Manitoba Junior Curling Championships going 4–3 in both years, and losing in a tiebreaker in 2015.

In 2015, Oliver joined the Abby Ackland junior rink, playing lead on the team. The rink won the 2016 Manitoba Junior Championship, sending the team to the 2016 Canadian Junior Curling Championships to represent Manitoba. There, the team finished with a 7–3 record, before losing in a tiebreaker to New Brunswick's Justine Comeau rink.

In 2016, Oliver joined the Laura Burtnyk rink as the team's second. The team won the 2017 Manitoba juniors, sending Oliver to play for Manitoba once again at the 2017 Canadian Junior Curling Championships. There, the team finished with a 5–4 record, missing the championship round.

In 2017, Oliver played her last junior season playing third on the Meghan Walter rink. That season, the team lost in the finals of the Manitoba junior championship.

Mixed
Oliver played lead on the Colin Kurz rink that won the 2019 Canadian Mixed Curling Championship at home in Winnipeg, and won the 2019 World Mixed Curling Championship for Canada.

Women's
Oliver joined up with Abby Ackland again in 2018 as her lead. She played in her first women's provincial championship in 2019. There, the team finished with a 5–2 record in pool play, and won a tiebreaker game before losing to Kerri Einarson in the 3 vs. 4 game.

The next season, the team won their first tour event, the Atkins Curling Supplies Classic. Later that season, the team played in the 2020 Manitoba Scotties Tournament of Hearts, where they finished with a 3–2 record, missing the playoffs. Ackland could not play in the event, as she was eight months pregnant. Instead, Hailey Ryan took over the reins.

In 2021, both Ackland and Oliver joined the Kaitlyn Jones rink, playing front end for the team. The team played in the 2021 Canadian Curling Pre-Trials Direct-Entry Event in an attempt to qualify for the 2022 Winter Olympics. There, the team went 3–2, failing to qualify for the next qualifying event. Later that season, with Ackland now skipping the team and throwing third, and Jones throwing last rocks the team played in the 2022 Manitoba Scotties Tournament of Hearts. The team finished 6–2 in pool play before losing to Kristy Watling in the semifinal.

The team further reconfigured their line-up for the 2022-23 curling season, with Meghan Walter joining the team, initially at third, with Ackland skipping. The team found immediate success, winning the 2022 DeKalb Superspiel.  
  The team eventually had Ackland and Walter trade positions, with Walter skipping the team. The team made their first Grand Slam event at the 2023 Canadian Open, losing in the quarterfinal to Korea's Gim Eun-ji rink. The team played in the 2023 Manitoba Scotties Tournament of Hearts. They went 5-3 after pool play, then beat Beth Peterson in a tiebreaker, Kaitlyn Lawes in the semifinal, then lost to Jennifer Jones in the final. Despite the loss, the team still qualified for the 2023 Scotties Tournament of Hearts national championships, as a Wild Card entry.

Personal life
Oliver is originally from Marquette, Manitoba, and went to high school at Warren Collegiate Institute in nearby Warren. Oliver attended the University of Manitoba. She works as a massage therapist for Warren Chiropractic and Health Centre.

References

Living people
1996 births
Canadian women curlers
Curlers from Winnipeg
People from Interlake Region, Manitoba
University of Manitoba alumni
Canadian mixed curling champions
World mixed curling champions